John Delbert Barnes (born April 24, 1976) is an American former professional baseball outfielder. Barnes is a graduate of Granite Hills High School and attended Grossmont College in El Cajon, California

Career
Barnes was selected in the fourth round of the 1996 Major League Baseball draft by the Boston Red Sox.  In , he was traded, along with Joe Thomas and Matt Kinney, to the Minnesota Twins for Greg Swindell and Orlando Merced. He achieved his best minor league season in 2000 with the Twins' Triple-A affiliate in Salt Lake City, winning the Pacific Coast League batting crown with a .365 average along with a 1.004 OPS, 56 extra base hits and 87 RBI. The performance earned him his first promotion to the major leagues, where he batted .351 with an .874 OPS in limited action for the Twins. 

His numbers in Triple-A tailed off in 2001, and after a meager .048 average in 23 plate appearances with the 2001 Twins, he was placed on waivers and claimed by the Colorado Rockies.

In , Barnes played with the Atlanta Braves organization with the Mississippi Braves and the Richmond Braves, his last season as a position player. In  he returned to the Red Sox organization and was converted to a knuckleball pitcher.

References

External links

1976 births
Living people
American expatriate baseball players in Canada
Baseball players from San Diego
Colorado Springs Sky Sox players
Edmonton Trappers players
Greenville Drive players
Grossmont Griffins baseball players
Gulf Coast Dodgers players
Gulf Coast Red Sox players
Lancaster JetHawks players
Las Vegas 51s players
Major League Baseball outfielders
Michigan Battle Cats players
Minnesota Twins players
Mississippi Braves players
Nashville Sounds players
New Britain Rock Cats players
Pawtucket Red Sox players
Portland Sea Dogs players
Richmond Braves players
Salt Lake Buzz players
Sportspeople from El Cajon, California
Trenton Thunder players
Wilmington Blue Rocks players